Klonari is a village in the Limassol District of Cyprus, located east of Kellaki.

References

Communities in Limassol District